Worrawoot Srimaka (Thai: วรวุฒิ ศรีมะฆะ) is a Thai football coach and former player. He was a striker who scored 29 goals for the Thailand national football team.

Club career
His career began in 1991 with Thai Farmers Bank. He won the Thai League three times, AFC Champions League twice and the Queen's Cup once. In 1996, he moved to BEC Tero Sasana and won two Thai League titles. In 2003, his team reached the final of the AFC Champions League, losing to Al Ain. He was the top scorer in the 2001–02 Thai League. In the 2002–03 season, he went to Malaysia to play for Kelantan FA and then joined Bình Định in Vietnam in 2004. In the 2005 AFC Champions League, he scored a goal against a Thai club, Krung Thai Bank. He returned to Thailand to play for Chonburi and left for Customs Department in the summer of 2008. He ended his career with Chula United, whom he joined in 2009.

International career
He won the 2000 Tiger Cup with Thailand and scored a hat-trick to clinch a decisive 4–1 win over Indonesia in the final. With 5 goals, he was also one of the tournament's two top scorers, along with Indonesia's Gendut Doni Christiawan.

International goals

Managerial statistics

Honours
Player
Thailand
 SEA Games  Gold medal: 1995, 1997, 1999.  Silver medal: 1991
 AFF Championship  Winner: 1996, 2000, 2002
 Asian Games 4th; 1998
 King's Cup  Winner: 1994, 2000

Clubs
Thai Farmers Bank
 AFC Champions League  Champions: 1994, 1995
 Thai League 1  Champions: 1991, 1992, 1993, 1995
 Queen's Cup  Champions: 1994, 1995
 Afro-Asian Club Championship  Champions: 1994

BEC Tero Sasana
 AFC Champions League Runner-up: 2002
 Thai League T1  Champions: 2000, 2001

Chonburi FC
 Thai League 1  Champions: 2007

Manager
Thailand U23
 SEA Games  Gold medal: 2017
 Dubai Cup  Winner: 2016

Thailand U21
 Nations Cup  Winner: 2016

Suphanburi F.C.
 Thai Division 1 League (Thai League 2 today) Runner-up: 2012

Individual
 AFF Championship top scorer: 2000
 Thai Premier League top scorer: 1997, 2001–02

References

External Links
 

1971 births
Living people
Worrawoot Srimaka
Worrawoot Srimaka
Worrawoot Srimaka
1996 AFC Asian Cup players
2000 AFC Asian Cup players
Worrawoot Srimaka
Worrawoot Srimaka
Kelantan FA players
Worrawoot Srimaka
binh Dinh FC players
Worrawoot Srimaka
Worrawoot Srimaka
Malaysia Super League players
Thai expatriate sportspeople in Malaysia
Expatriate footballers in Malaysia
Thai expatriate sportspeople in Vietnam
Worrawoot Srimaka
Thai expatriate footballers
Association football forwards
Footballers at the 1998 Asian Games
Worrawoot Srimaka
Southeast Asian Games medalists in football
Worrawoot Srimaka
Worrawoot Srimaka
Worrawoot Srimaka
Worrawoot Srimaka
Competitors at the 1991 Southeast Asian Games
Competitors at the 1995 Southeast Asian Games
Competitors at the 1997 Southeast Asian Games
Competitors at the 1999 Southeast Asian Games
Worrawoot Srimaka
Worrawoot Srimaka